Edward Leroy Koffenberger (July 4, 1926 – September 21, 2014) was an American stand-out basketball and lacrosse player for the Duke University in 1945–46 and 1946–47. He is considered Duke's first "two-sport star" even though most of his accolades came from playing basketball. A native of Wilmington, Delaware, Koffenberger is the only First Team All-American basketball player from his home state when the Helms Foundation awarded him the distinction. As a  center, Koffenberger led the Blue Devils in scoring during both seasons he played for them, and during his senior season of 1946–47, he led the Southern Conference in both scoring and rebounding. He was a two-time All-American and two-time All-Conference selection in basketball, and in lacrosse he was a one-time All-American for his intimidating defensive presence. In 54 career basketball games he scored 733 points, including a then-Duke record 416 in 1946–47.

Koffenberger was selected by the Philadelphia Warriors in a late round of the 1947 BAA draft, although he only briefly played professionally but never in the Basketball Association of America. After basketball he became an engineer, spending the majority of his career at DuPont.

Koffenberger died of leukemia on September 21, 2014 at the age of 88.

References

1926 births
2014 deaths
All-American college men's basketball players
American men's basketball players
Basketball players from Wilmington, Delaware
Centers (basketball)
Deaths from leukemia
Duke Blue Devils football players
Duke Blue Devils men's basketball players
Duke Blue Devils men's lacrosse players
North Carolina Tar Heels football players
Philadelphia Warriors draft picks
Players of American football from Wilmington, Delaware